Helpe Majeure is a river that runs through the Nord department in the Hauts-de-France region of France. It rises in the municipality of Ohain, with about a third of its watershed in Belgium, near the town of Momignies. The river initially marks the Franco-Belgian border as it flows north.

See also
 Lac du Val-Joly, an artificial lake in France, created by damming the Helpe Majeure

References

Rivers of the Ardennes (France)
Rivers of France
Rivers of Hauts-de-France
Rivers of Nord (French department)